Kirill Andreyevich Petrov (born April 13, 1990) is a Russian professional ice hockey player currently playing for Ak Bars Kazan of the Kontinental Hockey League (KHL). Petrov was drafted by the New York Islanders in the third round, 73rd overall, in the 2008 NHL Entry Draft. He was considered a "blue-chip" first-round talent that dropped to the third round of the 2008 NHL Entry Draft due to his contract status at the time with Ak Bars.

Playing career
Petrov was drafted by the New York Islanders in the third round, 73rd overall, in the 2008 NHL Entry Draft. He was considered a "blue-chip" first-round talent that dropped to the third round of the 2008 NHL Entry Draft due to his contract status with Ak Bars Kazan of the Kontinental Hockey League (KHL).

Petrov represented Russia at the 2010 World Junior Ice Hockey Championships, leading his team in scoring and being promoted to team captain by the end of the competition. Petrov was the 8th overall scorer in the entire tournament.

There was a real possibility of him joining the New York Islanders of the National Hockey League (NHL) for the 2010–11 season. However, Ak Bars Kazan kept him under contract until the end of the 2014–15 season.

On July 1, 2015, Petrov belatedly signed a one-year entry-level contract with the Islanders. However, following 13 games with the Islanders' minor league affiliate, the Bridgeport Sound Tigers, Petrov returned to Russia to play for CSKA Moscow.

On May 16, 2018, Petrov's rights were traded from CSKA to Avangard Omsk.

After a lone season with Avangard, Petrov returned to Ak Bars Kazan as a free agent, securing a one-year contract on 7 May 2019.

Career statistics

Regular season and playoffs

International

Awards and honours

References

External links
 

1990 births
Living people
Ak Bars Kazan players
Avangard Omsk players
Bridgeport Sound Tigers players
HC CSKA Moscow players
New York Islanders draft picks
Russian ice hockey right wingers
HC Yugra players